Hans Nieland (3 October 1900 in Hagen – 29 August 1976 in Reinbek near Hamburg) was a politician of the German Nazi-Party (NSDAP) and Lord Mayor of Dresden from 1940 until 1945.

Career 
Nieland was drafted into the Imperial Army in June 1918 just after his final examinations at modern grammar school. He remained a soldier until one month after the end of World War I (discharge in December 1918). From February 1919 he studied political science at the universities of Göttingen and Hamburg. After the end of his studies in July 1922 he worked as a commercial clerk for three years in two Hamburg export firms. Hereupon followed a job training in the local and provincial administration. Afterwards Nieland went to the small town Kirchhörde (which now forms part of Dortmund) as a candidate for the career of a Westphalian bailiff. His political career started as a head of the district authority in his native town Hagen, later on Nieland became district president in Münster. In 1925 he received his doctorate in Hamburg. His doctoral thesis, completed in June 1925, was entitled "Power as a governmental concept of law: An analysis of the German Reich's constitutional law situation under the rule of the Versailles Treaty"
(German: "Die Macht als staatlicher Rechtsbegriff: Zugleich eine Untersuchung über die staatsrechtliche Stellung des Deutschen Reiches unter der Herrschaft des Versailler Vertrages").

On 30 January 1926 Hans Nieland joined the NSDAP (membership number 33 333), became Bezirksführer 
() at home and then Sektionsführer in Hamburg. Moreover, he entered the SS (membership number 61 702), was promoted SS Major General Brigadeführer on 30 January 1939 and achieved his assignment to the Staff SS Upper Sector "Elbe" (German: Stab SS-Oberabschnitt "Elbe") on 9 November 1944. From November 1926 until March 1928 he applied himself to law studies again in Münster and Göttingen. In December 1928 he became an intern with the Altona legal authorities. On 14 September 1930 he was elected Member of the Reichstag for the Hamburg constituency.

On 1 May 1931 Hans Nieland was appointed Leader of the NSDAP Foreign Organization (abbreviated: NSDAP/AO), which was founded in Hamburg, by NSDAP Reichsorganisationsleiter Gregor Strasser. He visited the Netherlands and England from  1931-1932. He stayed in London from 15–19 January 1932, where he spoke to an audience of approximately 200 people. Upon returning, Nieland already resigned from Strasser's party office on 8 May 1933 because he had acceded to more important duties in the meantime. From 5 March to 14 October 1933 he was head of the Hamburg police and from 18 May 1933 he was a member of the Hamburg provincial government. Nieland assumed the Hamburg revenue office in May 1933. Additionally, he directed parts of the Administration for Economics, Technology and Labour since November 1934. After the Groß-Hamburg Gesetz came into force in April 1937 Nieland was awarded the title Senator and the position of a city treasurer for life. In February 1940 he was appointed Lord Mayor of regional capital Dresden at the suggestion of Reichsstatthalter Martin Mutschmann by Reich Minister of the Interior Wilhelm Frick. After the heavy air raids of 13 and 14 February 1945, which destroyed the baroque historic section totally, Nieland left precipitously Dresden on 23 February 1945, disappeared completely for 8 days and turned up in Berlin on 3 March 1945.

From 2 June 1945 until August 1948 Nieland was detained in several British internment facilities, for example in Neumünster-Gadeland and in Civil Internment Camp No 5 Staumühle (near Paderborn). In August 1948 a fine was imposed on Nieland in the course of a "Spruchkammerverfahren" (English: "proceedings before denazification tribunals") in Bielefeld, which was regarded as compensated by the term of imprisonment, however. In 1949 he was classified as minderbelastet and in 1950 as Mitläufer ( or nominal member). After being released he worked for a time as a banker in Reinbek bei Hamburg.

References
 
 Christel Hermann: Oberbürgermeister der Stadt Dresden Hans Nieland und Stellvertreter Rudolf Kluge (in: Dresdner Geschichtsbuch. - Vol. No. 7 . - Altenburg : DZA Publishing House, 2001. - . - pp. 181–200) This is a publication by the Stadtgeschichtliche Museen Dresden (see ).

Notes

External links
 

1900 births
1976 deaths
People from Hagen
Nazi Party officials
Mayors of Dresden
SS-Brigadeführer
Gauleiters
Members of the Reichstag of the Weimar Republic
People from the Province of Westphalia
Nazis convicted of crimes